Beep, Beep is a 1952 Warner Bros. Merrie Melodies series directed by Chuck Jones. The short was released on May 24, 1952, and stars Wile E. Coyote and the Road Runner. The cartoon is named after the sound the Road Runner makes, which is often misheard as "Meep, meep".

Plot 
Road Runner is being chased by Wile E. Coyote carrying a knife and fork but the roadrunner is too fast. Wile E. tries a spring-loaded glove, which also fails. He crosses a tightwire to drop an anvil on Road Runner, but the anvil is too heavy, and Wile E. is stretched all the way to the ground, alerting Road Runner. Wile E. drops the anvil and is slung up into the air.

Wile E. sets entices Road Runner with water attached by string to a TNT device. Wile E. chases Road Runner into a mine.  Wile E. lights a match to see in the dark, but happens to be in a tunnel laden with explosives, which detonates. Wile E. loads himself on a springboard in order to sling himself towards the passing Road Runner. When he cuts the rope holding him back, he is slammed into the ground.

Wile E. is wearing a rocket to chase Road Runner. He lights the fuse, but the rocket fires directly up into the sky and explodes into fireworks showing a restaurant advertisement. He attempts to use ACME's rocket-powered roller skates to chase Road Runner. Wile E. is quicker than Road Runner and gains on him, when the road takes a turn, however, the coyote shoots off a cliff and crashes into the ground. He drinks the water he previously used as a trap, and the TNT explodes.

Wile E. places a small railroad track, two bushes, himself, and a railroad stop sign in the middle of the road. This fails to stop Road Runner, who mows down the Coyote and leaves him spread-eagled on the track to be flattened again by a train. Road Runner relaxes on the balcony of the caboose as it departs.

In Other Media 
 This short is briefly featured in the 1996 film, Space Jam, during a scene where Wile E. is doing the tightwire segment, Porky Pig shows up and interrupts the cartoon to get the Tunes to an emergency meeting concerning the Tunes being taken to Moron Mountain. The new footage of the short was produced by Warner Bros. Feature Animation.

See also 
 Looney Tunes and Merrie Melodies filmography (1950–1959)
 Beep, beep (sound)

References

External links 
 
 

Merrie Melodies short films
Warner Bros. Cartoons animated short films
1952 animated films
Short films directed by Chuck Jones
Wile E. Coyote and the Road Runner films
American comedy short films
1952 short films
American animated short films
Animated films about birds
1950s Warner Bros. animated short films
Animated films without speech
Films with screenplays by Michael Maltese
Films scored by Carl Stalling
Films about Canis
Animated films about mammals
Films produced by Edward Selzer